Aftab Ahmed (born 14 September 1983) is a former Pakistani cricketer. From Karachi, Sindh, Aftab played for Karachi at under-19 level from the 2000–01 season onwards, making his debut at the age of 16. He went on to make his first-class debut during the 2002–03 season, playing twice for the Public Works Department in the Quaid-e-Azam Trophy. His List A debut came later in the season, when he played four matches for the same team in the limited-overs National Bank of Pakistan Patron's Cup. A right-arm off spinner, Aftab's best bowling figures at first-class level came on debut, when he took 4/13 in Dadu's second innings to help the Public Works Department win by 97 runs. Despite being only 20 years old during his debut season, the 2002–03 season was his only season at a major level, although he did continue to play inter-district matches for local teams until the late 2000s.

References

1983 births
Living people
Pakistani cricketers
Public Works Department cricketers
Cricketers from Karachi